Khalid Nasser Fadhil Al-Braiki (born 3 July 1993), commonly known as Khalid Al-Braiki, is an Omani footballer who plays for Al-Seeb in Oman Professional League and the Oman national football team as a defender.

Career

International
Al-Braiki made his debut for Oman national team in a friendly match on 9 September 2018 against Lebanon. He was included in Oman's squad for the 2019 Asian Cup in the United Arab Emirates.

Career statistics

International
Statistics accurate as of match played 17 January 2019

References

External links

1993 births
Living people
Omani footballers
Oman international footballers
Association football defenders
Al-Musannah SC players
Al-Shabab SC (Seeb) players
Al-Nasr SC (Salalah) players
Oman Professional League players
2019 AFC Asian Cup players
People from Muscat, Oman